is a Japanese actress signed to Burning Production.

Biography
Izumi Inamori was born and grew up in Kagoshima Prefecture. After  finished from the local high school, Inamori went to University of Texas at Arlington to study English abroad. After a year and a half of school life in the United States, her family was poor so she returned to Japan, and soon started her career as a model locally at the age of 20 in 1992. In 1994, she made her film debut in the TV drama series "Ue o muite arukō!". She is also a first dan kendoka.

Filmography

Movies

TV dramas

Commercials
Shiseido - Elixir (1993)
Shiseido - Prime Rich (1993)
Suntory　- Dynamic (1993)
Lotte - Choco-Torte (1994)
Lotte - Toppo (1994)
Toyota - Corolla Celles (1994)
Nissan Motors - "RV de kawaranakya!" (1995)
Kirin Brewery Company - Kirin Lemon Select (1995)
Coca-Cola - Shpla (1996)
Meiji Life Insurance　- Fresh Life, Bright Life, Master Life (1996)
Lotte - Aroma Stick Chocolate (1996)
Lotte - Cool Mint Gum (1996)
Recruit - Travail (1997)
Ciba Vision - Focus Dailies (1997–1998)
Kao Corporation - 8x4 (1997)
Nintendo - The Legend of Zelda: Ocarina of Time (1998)
Nissan Motors - Avenir (1998)
Asahi Soft Drinks - Jūrokucha (1998)
Kanebo - Revue (1999)
NTT docomo (1999)
DDI Cellular (1999)
NTT Communications (2000)
Mizuho Bank (2005)
Kao Corporation - Blaune (2005–2007)

References

External links
Izumi Inamori official website  
Izumi Inamori official MySpace 
Inamori Izumi Facebook Group 
 

1972 births
Living people
Japanese film actresses
Japanese television actresses
People from Kagoshima Prefecture
20th-century Japanese actresses
21st-century Japanese actresses